This article contains lists of scorers for the United States men's national water polo team at the Summer Olympics, and is part of the United States men's Olympic water polo team statistics series. The lists are updated as of March 30, 2020.

Abbreviations

Players with at least one goal at the Olympics
The following table is pre-sorted by number of total goals (in descending order), number of total matches played (in ascending order), edition of the Olympics (in ascending order), name of the player (in ascending order), respectively.

Tony Azevedo is the top scorer of all time for the United States men's Olympic water polo team, with 61 goals.

As a skilled left-hander, Chris Humbert is the American water polo player with the second most goals at the Olympic Games, scoring 37.

Historical progression – total goals at the Olympics 
The following table shows the historical progression of the record of total goals at the Olympic Games.

Players with at least one goal in an Olympic tournament
The following table is pre-sorted by number of goals (in descending order), number of matches played (in ascending order), edition of the Olympics (in ascending order), Cap number or name of the player (in ascending order), respectively.

Bruce Bradley is the American male player with the most goals in an Olympic tournament, scoring 18.

Historical progression – goals in an Olympic tournament 
The following table shows the historical progression of the record of goals in an Olympic tournament.

Leading scorers for each Olympic tournament
The following table shows the players with at least five goals for each Olympic tournament, and is pre-sorted by edition of the Olympics (in ascending order), number of goals (in descending order), Cap number or name of the player (in ascending order), respectively.

Chris Humbert is the first and only American male player to have been the team-leading scorer for three Olympic tournaments (1992–2000).

Players with at least three goals (a hat-trick) in an Olympic match
The following table is pre-sorted by number of goals (in descending order), date of the match (in ascending order), Cap number or name of the player (in ascending order), respectively.

In water polo, if a player scores three times in a game, a hat-trick is made. Thirty-two American athletes have each made at least one hat-trick in an Olympic match.

Tony Azevedo is the American water polo player with the most hat-tricks made at the Olympic Games, scoring 11.

Bruce Bradley and Chris Humbert are the joint American male players with the second most hat-tricks made at the Olympic Games, scoring 6.

See also
 United States men's Olympic water polo team statistics
 United States men's Olympic water polo team statistics (appearances)
 United States men's Olympic water polo team statistics (matches played)
 United States men's Olympic water polo team statistics (goalkeepers)
 United States men's Olympic water polo team statistics (medalists)
 List of United States men's Olympic water polo team rosters
 United States men's Olympic water polo team results
 United States men's national water polo team

References

External links
 Official website

Men's Olympic statistics 3
Olympic men's statistics 3
United States Olympic men's statistics 3